Daniel Frisa (born April 27, 1955) is an American lawyer and former Republican politician. He was a United States Congressman and a state legislator from New York.

Born in Queens, New York, Frisa attended East Meadow, New York, public schools and graduated from St. John's University.  He earned his J.D. degree from Touro Law Center. He became an Eagle Scout at age thirteen.  He also was a marketing representative for Johnson & Johnson and a retail executive for Fortunoff before entering politics. Frisa was a member of the New York State Assembly from 1985 to 1992, sitting in the 186th, 187th, 188th and 189th New York State Legislatures.

Frisa unseated fellow Republican David A. Levy in the 1994 primary election, and served one term in the 104th Congress, representing New York's 4th congressional district.

Frisa ran for re-election in 1996 but was defeated by Carolyn McCarthy, who drew much attention to his opposition to certain federal firearms legislation. McCarthy's husband had died, and her son was injured, in the December 7, 1993, mass shooting by Colin Ferguson aboard a Long Island Rail Road commuter train. The shooting occurred in Frisa's district, and McCarthy became a gun control activist after the incident. The story was depicted in the 1998 television movie The Long Island Incident.

Since leaving Congress, Frisa has written for NewsMax and made appearances on politically oriented television programs. In 2002, he unsuccessfully sought to regain his congressional seat but placed second in a three-way Republican primary that was won by Marilyn O'Grady. Frisa is presently Senior Counsel with SHAHLA PC.

References

External links

 

1955 births
Living people
St. John's University (New York City) alumni
American people of Italian descent
Politicians from Nassau County, New York
Republican Party members of the New York State Assembly
Republican Party members of the United States House of Representatives from New York (state)
People from Queens, New York
People from East Meadow, New York